The Iraq Fed Cup team represents Iraq in Fed Cup tennis competition and are governed by the Iraqi Tennis Federation.  They have not competed since 2014.

History
Iraq competed in its first Fed Cup in 1998.  They have lost all their ties to date.

See also
Fed Cup
Iraq Davis Cup team

External links

Billie Jean King Cup teams
Fed Cup
Fed Cup